Calais (dated, Cales )  was a former constituency of the Parliament of England.

The Flemish town of Calais was under English rule from 1347 until 7 January 1558. During part of that time it was represented in the Parliament of England by two members.

In 1360 the Treaty of Brétigny assigned Guînes, Marck and Calais – collectively the "Pale of Cales" – to English rule in perpetuity, but in a daring raid during the rule of Mary I, was retaken by France. In 1363 the town was made a staple port.

Reforms in the representation of the town

King Henry VIII of England decided to modify the arrangements for the government of Calais. A statute (27 Hen. VIII, c. 63) made provision for two members to be returned to the Parliament of England. One member was to be nominated, elected and chosen by the Deputy (the King's representative in the town) and his Council. The other member was to be nominated, elected and chosen by the Mayor and his Council.

Under the provisions of the statute, members were elected to ten Parliaments. On 6 December 1557 a writ was issued for the election of members to an eleventh Parliament, but before it met Calais had fallen to the French.

Members of Parliament 1536-1558

References
 Constituencies: Calais, The House of Commons 1509-1558, by S.T. Bindoff (Secker & Warburg 1982)

1536 establishments in England
1558 disestablishments in England
History of Calais
Political history of France
Constituencies in the Parliament of England
Constituencies established in 1536
Constituencies disestablished in 1558